Advanced Digital Information Corporation (ADIC) was an American manufacturer of tape libraries and storage management software which is now part of Quantum Corp.  Their product line included both hardware, such as the Scalar line of robotic tape libraries, and software, such as the StorNext File System and the StorNext Storage Manager, a Hierarchical Storage Management system.  Partners and resellers included Apple, Dell, EMC, Fujitsu-Siemens, HP, IBM and Sun.

ADIC was acquired by Quantum in August 2006.

References

1983 establishments in Washington (state)
2006 disestablishments in Washington (state)
2006 mergers and acquisitions
American companies established in 1983
American companies disestablished in 2006
Computer companies established in 1983
Computer companies disestablished in 2006
Defunct companies based in Redmond, Washington
Defunct computer companies of the United States
Defunct technology companies of the United States